Panta-Kpa District is one of eight districts located in Bong County, Liberia.

See also
Palala

Districts of Liberia
Bong County